Mangalampet is a panchayat town in Cuddalore district in the Indian state of Tamil Nadu.

Demographics
 India census, Mangalampet had a population of 9278 of which 4698 are male and 4580 are female. Mangalampet has an average literacy rate of 85.30%, higher than the national average of 80.09%: male literacy is 91.80%, and female literacy is 78.78%. In Mangalampet, 11.85% of the population is under 6 years of age.

References 

Cities and towns in Cuddalore district